Bhobhar (English: The Live Ash) is a 2012 Rajasthani-language drama film written and directed by Gajendra S. Shrotriya. Besides some senior theatre artists like S N Purohit, Harinarayan Sharma, Anil Marwari, Sanjay Vidrohi, and Vasudev Bhatt in the supporting roles, the lead cast of Amit Saxena, Uttaranshy Pareek and Vikas Pareek are all from Jaipur. The film also highlights the culture and lifestyle of Rajasthan.

Plot
Bhobhar explores the life and relationship of a small farmer Rawat in rular Rajasthan, India. It is the story of a small village farmer Rewat who despite being an alcoholic is hardworking and warm-hearted. His life gets shattered one night when he catches his close friend Puran sneaking out of his room. Beaten up Puran accuses that an alcoholic's wife is no more than a whore. Rewat stops communicating with his wife Sohni since that day. One day when Sohni and his youngest son Ganesh beat up his other son Shanker for marrying a girl from another cast, inebriated Rewat calls Sohni a whore. Ganesh slaps his father for insulting his mother. Dismayed Rewat leaves his house and family until Puran finds him in the hospital. Puran meets Sohni and tells her about Rewat. The feelings of Sohni for Rewat gets rekindled alike Bhobhar (the live ash). Also begins the redemption of Puran and the story unfolds.

Cast
 Amit Saxena as Rewat
 Uttaranshy Pareek as Sohni 
 Vikas Pareek as Puran
 Ajay Jain as Mahaveer
 Nidhi Jain as Mahaveer's wife
 Anil Marwari as Ganesh
 Sanjay Vidrohi as MLA
 Vishal Bhatt as Jagdeesh
 Vinod Acharya as Sankar
 Vasudev Bhatt as Panch
 Babita Madaan as Singaari Tai
 Hari Narayan Sharma as Master
 Satya Narayan Purohit as Old man in field

Production
Shooting of the film Bhobhar was completed in October 2010. After two and a half months of post-production, the film was sent to several national and international film festivals with subtitles in English. The film is majorly in Rajasthani language to suit the milieu of the story. This is a Harbinger Creations production directed by Gajendra S. Shrotriya.

Music
Ramkumar Singh created the lyrics and Amit Ojha, the background score.

Release
After a successful round of national and international Film Festivals across the globe with subtitles in English, the film was released in theatres on 17 February 2012. Bhobhar had its World premiere at Corinth, Greece (CIFF) and the National premiere was held at Jaipur International Film Festival in 2011 (JIFF 2011).

Sequel
 Sequel Bhobhar 2 is being planned in 2017.

Critics
It is successful film while awarded Rajasthan government some money for best performing this film.

References

See also
 Rajasthani cinema
 List of Rajasthani-language films

Rajasthani-language films